Kaifeng railway station is a station on Longhai railway in Kaifeng, Henan.

History
In 1905, the construction of Kaifeng-Luoyang railway (the first section of the Longhai railway) started in order to connect Kaifeng, the province capital at that time, to the Beijing-Hankou railway at Zhengzhou. The Kaifeng-Zhengzhou section of the Kaifeng-Luoyang railway started operation in 1907, making the station the first station opened on Longhai railway (Zhengzhou railway station was regarded to be on the Beijing-Hankou railway then).

The current station building was finished and opened in 2003.

Future development
The station is planned to be renovated to serve as the terminus of Zhengzhou-Kaifeng intercity railway. The station will be expanded with a brand new station building. The project is expected to be finished in 2019.

See also
 Kaifeng North railway station

References

Railway stations in Henan
Stations on the Longhai Railway